Charactosuchus is an extinct genus of crocodilian. It was assigned to the family Crocodylidae in 1988. Specimens have been found in Colombia, Brazil, Jamaica, and possibly Florida and South Carolina. It was gharial-like in appearance with its long narrow snout but bore no relation to them, being  more closely related to modern crocodiles than to gharials.

Species

South America 
The type species, C. fieldsi, has been found from the Villavieja Formation at the Konzentrat-Lagerstätte La Venta in Colombia and dates back to the Middle Miocene (Laventan). It has also been found in the Mayoan to Montehermosan Urumaco Formation at Urumaco in Venezuela, and in the Solimões Formation in Acre State, Brazil, along with C. sansoai, and the possible species C. mendesi (sometimes assigned to Brasilosuchus).

Caribbean 
In 1969, a lower jaw of a crocodilian that dated back to the Lutetian stage of the Eocene was found in the Chapelton Formation of Saint James Parish, Jamaica, and was described as belonging to a new species of Charactosuchus named C. kugleri. However, this species may be considered synonymous with Dollosuchus, according to later papers.

North America 
Isolated teeth thought to be from the genus have been found from Florida and South Carolina and are of early Pliocene age. This was thought to be evidence of the interchange between North and South American faunas, with the genus first appearing in North America and then migrating down into Colombia and Brazil. This theory is no longer accepted, although the presence of  Charactosuchus from Jamaica may suggest a European origin, with the genus migrating across either the De Geer or Thule land bridges.

References

External links 
 Charactosuchus in the Paleobiology Database

Crocodilians
Paleogene crocodylomorphs
Miocene crocodylomorphs
Pliocene crocodylomorphs
Eocene reptiles of North America
Paleogene Jamaica
Fossils of Jamaica
Miocene reptiles of South America
Montehermosan
Huayquerian
Chasicoan
Mayoan
Laventan
Neogene Brazil
Fossils of Brazil
Neogene Colombia
Fossils of Colombia
Honda Group, Colombia
Neogene Venezuela
Fossils of Venezuela
Fossil taxa described in 1965
Prehistoric pseudosuchian genera